An aside is a dramatic device in which a character speaks to the audience.

Aside may also refer to:

Aside (magazine), a defunct Indian newsmagazine
"Aside", a song by Shinee from Dream Girl – The Misconceptions of You
"Aside", a song by The Weakerthans from Left and Leaving
, an HTML5 element
Aside (album), by South Korean singer Yoon Jisung

See also
"A-Side", a 1965 song by Roger Webb
A-side and B-side
Asides Besides, a 1998 compilation album by Talk Talk